{{DISPLAYTITLE:C11H14N2O2}}
The molecular formula C11H14N2O2 (molar mass: 206.241 g/mol) may refer to:

 Pheneturide
 Phenylethylmalonamide

Molecular formulas